Gulshan-e-Iqbal is a large middle-class to upper middle class (Block 15,16,17,18) residential and commercial neighborhood in the Karachi East district of Karachi, Sindh, Pakistan. It was previously administered as part of the Gulshan Town borough, which was disbanded in 2011.

History
Gulshan-e-Iqbal was populated under in 1966 under Scheme 24 of Karachi Development Authority. The name "Gulshan-e-Iqbal" means "the garden of Iqbal", referring to the national poet of Pakistan, Allama Muhammad Iqbal. It has notable gardens.

The municipal infrastructure of Gulshan-e-Iqbal is in a bad shape especially following the monsoon rains of 2022.

Demographics 
Gulshan Iqbal is a Muhajir dominated area.Gulshan-e-Iqbal has total population of 841,800, out of the total population 433,347 are Male, 408,298 are Female, and 155 are Transgender. The area has a population density of 29027.59.

Population By Mother Tongue

Subdivisions
Gulshan-e-Iqbal is divided in two parts:
 Gulshan-e-Iqbal I
 Gulshan-e-Iqbal II

Gyms and sports complexes 
 KMC Women Sports Complex
 Pavilion End Club
 National Sports Academy

Educational Institutions

Universities 
 Federal Urdu University of Arts, Sciences & Technology
 Iqra University, Gulshan Campus
 Iqra University, Gulshan Campus 2
 ICMA International
 Sir Syed University of Engineering and Technology
 IUSS Gulshan Campus
 UIT University
 Federal Civil Defense Training School
 Al-Kawthar University
 SSUET main entrance (University of Engineering & Technology)
 Aligarh Institute of Technology

Schools 

 Aitchison Model School
 Air Foundation School System Gulshan Campus
 Al Khair Education Foundation۔ الخیر ایجوکیشن فاؤنڈیشن
 Al Khaleej Islamic Education System
 Aligarh Academy
 All Saints School
 Beacon Light Academy Senior Campus
 Beaconhouse Gulshan Primary III
 Credo Preschool & Primary
 Credo School
 Froebel Girls Secondary campus E-115
 Govt. Girls Higher Secondary School
 Little Star Secondary School
 Manhal Education
 National High School
 PakTurk Maarif International Schools & Colleges Girls Campus
 Sadequain Academy
 Seeding Grammar School
 The Academy School, Gulshan Block-7 Campus
 The City School - Gulshan A Level
 The City School Gulshan Junior Campus
 The Froebel's School KG Section
 The Smart School Fatima Jinnah Campus
 Vaila's School For Children With Special Needs

Colleges 

 Bahria Foundation College
 Time Collegiate Campus 1

Islamic centers
 Masjid o Imambargah Madina-tul-Ilm (Nipa Chowrangi)
 Faizan-e-Madina (An international Islamic center of Dawat-e-Isalmi)
 Jamia Abu Bakr Al-Islamia (block 5)
Jamia Sattaria Islamia (Nipa Chowrangi)
Jamia Darasaat (opposite safari park)
Jamia Ahsan ul Uloom
Ashraful Madaris (Gulshan Block 2)
Baitul Mukarram Masjid
Khanqah Imdadia Ashrafia

Parks
 Safari Park
 Aziz Bhatti Park
 Sindbad (Rashid Minhas Road)

Public Parks 

 Amir Siddiqui Family Park & Ayeza Play Land
 Amir Zaki Shaheed Family Park (also called Family Park Block 5)
 Arshad Ali Sabri Family Park
 Bagh e Rizwan Family Park & Mini Zoo (also called Mehmood Ghaznavi Park)
 Bagh-e-Kausar Family Park
 Children Park KDA بچوں کا پارک
 Future Park Space
 Gulshan Family Park
 Hakeem Muhammad Saeed Play Ground
 Iftikhar Syed Sports Park
 Khwateen Park
 Nariyal Park
 Nasir Hussain Shaheed Family Park
 Social Welfare Society Park
 Tunkey Ground
 Women Sports Complex

Cemetery 

 Haji Leema Khan Gabol Goth Qabristan

See also 
 Gulistan-e-Johar
 Gulzar-e-Hijri
 Moti Mahal
 Nasir Hussein Shaheed Hospital

References

External links 
 Karachi Website (Archived)
 Town Municipal Administration Gulshan-e-Iqbal Town

Neighbourhoods of Karachi
Gulshan Town
Memorials to Muhammad Iqbal